L'Incendie is the seventh album by experimental French singer Brigitte Fontaine and the fifth by Areski Belkacem, released in 1974 on the Byg Records label. It is their third collaborative album.

Le 6 septembre is a song about the Black September. Les Petites Madones is a song against capital punishment. Nous avons tant parlé is about an aspect of life as a couple.

L'Engourdie was written for Françoise Hardy, who never recorded it. L'Abeille is particular, as on this song, Areski wrote the lyrics and Fontaine the music, which is the contrary of their usual collaborative process.

Track listing

References

1974 albums
Brigitte Fontaine albums
Areski Belkacem albums